Keith Starrett (born 1951) is a senior United States district judge of the United States District Court for the Southern District of Mississippi.

Education and career

Born in McComb, Mississippi, Starrett received a Bachelor of Science degree from Mississippi State University in 1972 and a Juris Doctor from the University of Mississippi School of Law in 1974. He was in private practice in Mississippi from 1975 to 1992. He was an assistant district attorney (part-time) of the 14th Circuit Court District of Mississippi in 1981. He was a Circuit Court judge of the 14th Circuit Court District of Mississippi from 1992 to 2004.

Federal judicial service

On July 6, 2004, Starrett was nominated by President George W. Bush to a seat on the United States District Court for the Southern District of Mississippi vacated by Charles W. Pickering. Starrett was confirmed by the United States Senate on November 20, 2004, and received his commission on December 13, 2004. He assumed senior status on April 30, 2019.

External links
 

1951 births
Living people
Judges of the United States District Court for the Southern District of Mississippi
United States district court judges appointed by George W. Bush
21st-century American judges
Mississippi State University alumni
University of Mississippi School of Law alumni
Circuit court judges in the United States
People from McComb, Mississippi